Hampden Township may refer to the following townships in the United States:

 Hampden Township, Cumberland County, Pennsylvania
 Hampden Township, Kittson County, Minnesota
 Hampden Township, Coffey County, Kansas

See also 
 Hampton Township, Allegheny County, Pennsylvania